The Treason Act 1817 (57 Geo 3 c 6) was an Act of the Parliament of the United Kingdom of Great Britain and Ireland. It made it high treason to assassinate the Prince Regent. It also made permanent the Treason Act 1795, which had been due to expire on the death of George III.

All the provisions of this Act in relation to the Treason Act 1795, except such of the same as related to the compassing, imagining, inventing, devising or intending death or destruction, or any bodily harm tending to death or destruction, maim or wounding, imprisonment or restraint of the persons of the heirs and successors of George III, and the expressing, uttering or declaring of such compassings, imaginations, inventions, devices or intentions, or any of them, were repealed by section 1 of the Treason Felony Act 1848.

Sections 2 and 3 were repealed by the Statute Law Revision Act 1873.

The Acts of 1817 and 1795 were repealed by the Crime and Disorder Act 1998.

See also
Seditious Meetings Act 1817
Habeas Corpus Suspension Act 1817
Treason Act

References

External links
Text of the Treason Act 1817 as it stood immediately before its repeal in 1998, from the UK Statute Law Database.

Treason in the United Kingdom
United Kingdom Acts of Parliament 1817
Repealed United Kingdom Acts of Parliament